Lyskovskaya is a rural locality (a village) in Troitskoye Rural Settlement, Ust-Kubinsky District, Vologda Oblast, Russia. The population was 15 as of 2002.

Geography 
Lyskovskaya is located 49 km northwest of Ustye (the district's administrative centre) by road. Feninskaya is the nearest rural locality.

References 

Rural localities in Ust-Kubinsky District